Roger Quincy Williams (April 30, 1894 - August 12, 1976) was an American aviator. He established The Roger Q. Williams School of Aeronautics. He designed the Yankee Aerocoupe.

Biography
He was born in Brooklyn, New York on April 30, 1894.

In July 1929 Williams, with Lewis Yancey, broke the over-water flying record by making a non-stop flight from Old Orchard Beach, Maine to Santander, Spain. The 3,400 mile flight took 31 hours and 30  minutes. After minor repairs in Spain, the Bellanca monoplane continued on to Rome.

In 1937 he filed for bankruptcy.

During World War I, Williams served with the United States Army Air Corps. Between 1942 and 1946 Williams served with the United States Army Air Forces. Williams wrote Flying to the Moon and Halfway Back in 1949.

In 1971, Williams received a National Aviation Hall of Fame award from the OX-5 Club.

Williams died in Alameda, California on August 12, 1976.

References

Further reading
”Flights and Fliers” Time Magazine, June 17, 1929
”Wives of Fliers Happy”, The New York Times, July 11, 1929
Heinmuller, John Paul Virgil. Man's Fight to Fly; Famous World-Record Flights and a Chronology of Aviation. New York: Funk & Wagnalls Co, 1944.
Roseberry, Cecil. The Challenging Skies; The Colorful Story of Aviation's Most Exciting Years, 1919-1939. Garden City, N.Y.: Doubleday, 1966.
Scott, Catherine D. Aeronautics and Space Flight Collections. New York: Haworth Press, 1985.
University of Wyoming, D. C. Thompson, and John Hanks. Guide to Transportation History Resources at the American Heritage Center. Laramie: The Center, 1996.

External links

Old Orchard Beach Airfield
OX-5 Aviation Pioneers
Roger Q. Williams papers at the University of Wyoming - American Heritage Center

1894 births
1976 deaths
American test pilots
United States Army Air Forces officers
United States Army Air Service pilots of World War I
United States Army Air Forces pilots of World War II
Aviation pioneers
American aviation record holders